Pemboewan or Pemboeang was a subdistrict of the Dutch East Indies, located in modern-day Central Kalimantan, Indonesia.

Pemboewan is believed to have been the forerunner of the current Seruyan Regency. This district was established not long after Sunan Nata Alam handed over Pembuang Banjar to the  Dutch VOC.

Early History  
The Pemboewan area was originally the territory of the Banjar Sultanate. At that time, a lot of area expansion was carried out by the Banjar Sultanate which made the Sultanate's territory very wide. At that time, this area was called Pambuang.

According to the Radermacher report, in 1780 the head of the Pembuang area (now Seruyan Regency) was Raden Jaya.

Since August 13, 1787, the Pembuang area (Seruyan Regency) was handed over by Sunan Nata Alam to the Dutch VOC.

Leaders 

 1834 Kjai ngabei Djaja-negara (head of Pemboewan).
 1847 Djoeragan Brahim (head of Pemboewan, Sampit and Semboeloe).
 1850 Raden Moeda (head of Pemboewan).
 1859 Djaja Ngagara (head of Pemboewan and Semboeloe).
 1870 Joeragan Moehammad Seman (district head of Pemboeang).

De facto 

 Pembuang, according to Hikayat Banjar.
 According to the Staatsblad van Nederlandsch Indië of 1849, this region is included in the Zuid-ooster-afdeeling based on Besluit van den Minister van Staat, Gouverneur-Generaal van Nederlandsch-Indië.
 On August 27, 1849, No. 8  In 1855, this area was part of the Zuider-afdeeling van Borneo.

Government development  
 Before 1880, the Seruyan area consisted of 13 villages where government officials were called "Assistant Kjai" who ruled directly from Sampit. The villages were Beratih (now Kuala Pembuang), Telaga Pulang, Sembuluh, Pembuang Hulu, Asam, Durian Kait, Sandul, Sukamandang, Rantau Pulut, Tumbang Kale, Tumbang Manjul, Sepundu Hantu, Tumbang Darap.
 In 1880. With the rapid development and growth of villages, an onderdistrict was formed with the capital city at Telaga Pulang.
 In 1902, the capital moved from Telaga Pulang to Pembuang Hulu.
 In 1905, the capital in Pembuang Hulu was moved to Kuala Pembuang, because of its location on the south coast, so it was considered strategic, especially for government, transportation and economic activities at that time.

End  
 In 1940, the Japanese Empire expanded its territory to the South, namely to the Southeast Asia region, getting into conflict with the Dutch East Indies. The Dutch East Indies fell to the Japanese. Japan took control of the Pemboewan in early 1941.

In 1946, the kecamatan of Seruyan was formed out of the onderdistrict of Pemboeang, with Kuala Pembuang as its capital. Seruyan then joined the Great Dayak region under the leadership of J. van Dyk, ending the Pemboeang era.

Seruyan government 

 In 1947, Seruyan was divided into two sub-districts, namely: 
 Seruyan Hilir with the capital city of Kuala Pembuang and the kawedanan of West Sampit, 
 Seruyan Hulu with Rantau Pulut as its capital and the kawedanan of North Sampit.
 The Seruyan region at that time included the province of South Kalimantan (before the formation of the province of Central Kalimantan in 1957) and the regency of Kotawaringin (before it was divided into the regencies of East Kotawaringin Regency and West Kotawaringin Regency).
 1958. The Seruyan Hulu sub-district is divided into 2 (two) sub-districts, namely: Central Seruyan with the capital city at Rantau Pulut.
 Government of the Seruyan Level II Preparatory Region in 1965. With some changes to the Government Organizational Structure, with the issuance of the Decree of the Governor of the Head of the Level I Region of Central Kalimantan No: 05/Pem.232-c-2-4/1965 dated May 1, 1965 concerning Determination of the Seruyan Level II Preparatory Region. In connection with this, the status of the Seruyan Kawedanan Government changed to a Seruyan Level II Preparatory District with the capital city of Kuala Pembuang.
 The East Kotawaringin Sub-district Seruyan Government was formed based on: Minister of Home Affairs Decree Number 64 of 1979 dated 28 April 1979 concerning the Establishment of the Kapuas Regent's Assistant Work Area for the Gunung Mas Region, the East Kotawaringin Regent's Assistant for the Katingan Region, the East Kotawaringin Assistant Regent for the Seruyan Region, Assistant Regent of North Barito for the Murung Raya Region, Assistant Regent of South Barito for the East Barito Region, Decree of the Governor of the First Level Region of Central Kalimantan Number: 148/KPTS/1979 dated 28 June 1979 concerning the Elimination of the Status of the Regions and Level II Administrative Offices of Gunung Mas, Katingan, Murung Raya and East Barito as well as the status of the Seruyan Region and Preparatory Level II Regional Offices, and the Decree of the Governor of the Head of the First Level Region of Central Kalimantan Number: 247/KPTS/1980 dated July 2, 1980 regarding the Organizational Structure and Work Procedure of the Office of the Assistant District Head of Kotawaringin East for Seruyan Region. The Administration of the Assistant Regent of the Regent (TUBUP) of the East Kotawaringin Seruyan Region with the capital city domiciled in Kuala Pembuang.
 Seruyan Regency Government in 2002. The Seruyan Regency Government was established based on Law Number 5 of 2002 concerning the Establishment of Katingan Regency, Seruyan Regency, Sukamara Regency, Lamandau Regency, Gunung Mas Regency, Pulang Pisau Regency, Murung Raya Regency and East Barito Regency in the Province of Central Kalimantan, which was inaugurated by the Minister of Home Affairs on behalf of the President of the Republic of Indonesia on July 2, 2002, in Jakarta. The capital city of Seruyan Regency is Kuala Pembuang, Seruyan Hilir District. The District Provisional Leader is Loper Anggus.
 The election of Darwan Ali as the First Regent of Seruyan Regency in 2003 Starts a new chapter of this Regency. Under the leadership of Darwan Ali, a large number of Seruyan Areas were built and renovated.

References 

History of Indonesia
1878 establishments
1946 disestablishments
Dutch East Indies